Popalzai or Popalzay, also known as Popal, are Durrani (formerly called Abdali or Bor Tareen) Pashtuns of Afghanistan. The Popalzai are part of the Zirak confederation of Pashtun tribes. The origin of the Abdali forefathers of the Sadozai tribe is probably the Hephthalites. The forefathers of Ahmad Shāh Durrānī, the founder of the Durrani Empire, were from the Sadozai tribe which is a subtribe of the Popalzai. According to Mohan Lal, the Zirak line begins with Sulaiman Zirak Khan, who was the father of Popalzai, Barakzai, and Alakozai. The tribe's origin is Kandahar, Afghanistan.
The majority of the Popalzai live in the southern areas of Afghanistan such as in Kandahar, Helmand or Uruzgan. A small number of Popalzais and Sadozais live in Pakistan, particularly in the cities of Quetta, Bannu, Dera Ismail Khan, Sudhanoti District, Poonch, In Azad Kashmir, Sadhan is known as Sadozai, a branch of the Popalzai tribe.
 Peshawar and Multan. Some members of the Popalzai tribe have migrated with their families to the European Union, North America, and Oceania. Notable members of the Popalzai tribe include Hamid Karzai and his extended family, Karim Popal, Naim Popal, and Khalida Popal.

Notable people
 Ahmad Shah Durrani, Founder of the Durrani Empire
 Hamid Karzai, President of Afghanistan 2001–2014
 Abdul Ghani Baradar, co-founder and deputy leader of the Taliban
 Ahmed Wali Karzai
 Jan Mohammad Khan
 Omid Popalzay
 Naim Popal

References 

Durrani Pashtun tribes